Hemerocallis fulva, the orange day-lily, tawny daylily, corn lily, tiger daylily, fulvous daylily, ditch lily or Fourth of July lily (also railroad daylily, roadside daylily, outhouse lily, and wash-house lily), is a species of daylily native to Asia. It is very widely grown as an ornamental plant in temperate climates for its showy flowers and ease of cultivation. It is not a true lily in the genus Lilium, but gets its name from the superficial similarity of its flowers to Lilium and from the fact that each flower lasts only one day.

Description

Both diploid and triploid forms occur in the wild, but most cultivated plants are triploids which rarely produce seeds and primarily reproduce vegetatively by stolons. At least four botanical varieties are recognized, including the typical triploid var. fulva, the diploid, long-flowered var. angustifolia (syn.: var. longituba), the triploid var. Flore Pleno, which has petaloid stamens, and the evergreen var. aurantiaca.

Distribution
Orange daylily is native to Asia from the Caucasus east through the Himalaya through China, Japan, and Korea. Orange daylily persists where planted, making them a very good garden plant.

Hemerocallis fulva var. fulva has escaped from cultivation across much of the United States and parts of Canada and has become a weedy or invasive species. It persists also where dumped and spreads more or less rapidly by vegetative increase into woods and fields and along roadsides and ditches, hence its common name ditch lily. It forms dense stands that exclude native vegetation, and is often mistaken for a native species.

Cultivation
Hemerocallis fulva has been cultivated in Europe and naturalized there since at least the 16th century. A few cultivated varieties exist which are grown as ornamental plants. Their propagation is by division since most plants in cultivation are sterile triploids.

They are long lived perennials that are adaptable to varied garden conditions and vigorous growers doing well in even difficult areas where other plants do not thrive. The plants grow well in full sun to open shade, and are drought tolerant. H. fulva is winter hardy to UDSA Zone 4.

All portions of Hemerocallis species may be seriously toxic to cats and somewhat toxic to dogs. Cats are particularly vulnerable as their fastidious nature causes them to lick accidentally transferred pollen from their fur.

Uses
The flowers, leaves, and tubers are edible. The leaves and shoots can be eaten raw or cooked when very young (or they become too fibrous). The flowers and young tubers can also be eaten raw or cooked. The flowers taste better when cooked but can also be fried for storage or dried and used as a thickener in soup. The cooked flower buds, served with butter, taste like green beans or wax beans. The tubers are a good potato substitute.

References

External links

fulva
Plants used in traditional Chinese medicine
Edible plants
Tubers
Flora of China
Flora of Eastern Asia
Garden plants
Plants described in 1753
Taxa named by Carl Linnaeus